KSLK may refer to:

 KSLK (FM), a radio station (101.7 FM) licensed to serve Selawik, Alaska, United States
 KSLK (California), a defunct radio station (96.1 FM) formerly licensed to serve Visalia, California, United States
 Adirondack Regional Airport (ICAO code KSLK)